The knobsnout parrotfish (Scarus ovifrons) is a species of marine ray-finned fish, a parrotfish, in the family Scaridae which is famous for its characteristic blue color.  It lives in reefs and coral reefs.  It grows to a maximum length of about 90 cm.  Its body is a strong blue color, and may have reddish-brown, white, or black spots on it.  Adult fish have whitish spots on their cheeks and a lump on their foreheads.  Young fish have no spots on their cheeks or lumps on their foreheads. It is found in the northwestern Pacific Ocean off Japan and Taiwan.

References

ovifrons
Taxa named by Coenraad Jacob Temminck
Taxa named by Hermann Schlegel
Fish described in 1846